Colonial Heights is a neighborhood in the southeast part of the City of Sacramento, California. An older neighborhood, established in 1910, it makes a fairly typical example of a turn of the century "Streetcar Suburb". Before cars and buses took over for transportation needs, it was built around the convenient and efficient electric streetcar service provided by the Central California Traction Company.

Location 

The neighborhood of Colonial Heights is located in Southeast Sacramento. It consists of the area bordered on the west by Stockton Boulevard, east by 58th street, north by 14th avenue, and on the south by 22nd avenue.

Park 

Colonial Heights has a city park located at its center. The park consists of the area between 18th and 19th Avenues north-south and between 54th and 53rd Street east-west.

The park contains a wading pool, playgrounds for children and toddlers, picnic benches, a softball/baseball diamond, a field for soccer or other activities, and a basketball half-court.

Neighborhood association

The neighborhood association meets at the Colonial Heights Library in the south-west of the neighborhood.

Politics

Government 
Colonial Heights is represented by the following government districts:
 Sacramento City Council: Sacramento City District 5
 Sacramento County Board of Supervisors: Sacramento County District 1
 California State Legislature: 9th Assembly District; 6th Senate District
 United States House of Representatives: .

References

External links 
Tahoe/Colonial Collaborative for Healthy Kids

Neighborhoods in Sacramento, California
Populated places established in 1910